Hepu, alternately romanized as Hoppo, Hopu or Hop'u, is a county under the administration of Beihai City in southeastern Guangxi, China. It borders Lianjiang (Guangdong) to the southeast, Bobai County to the northeast, the Gulf of Tonkin to the south, Qinzhou to the west, and Pubei County to the north. Then-Premier Li Peng called this place "the Southern Pearl County" in November 1992. The county was once known as Lianzhou (Postal: Limchow).

History 

In antiquity, Hepu county was originally part of a larger county which encompassed part of Guangxi, Guangdong and even parts of Hainan. It was established in 111 BCE by Emperor Wu of the Han dynasty, during the first Chinese domination of Vietnam. During the brief interruption of the Han dynasty by Wang Mang, many of his opponents were exiled and banished to Hepu.

 1949–1950: Hepu administered Beihai as a town
 June 1965: administered by Qinzhou Region of Guangxi, prior
 July 1, 1987: administered by Beihai City

Administrative divisions 
The county administers 13 towns and 2 townships:

Towns:
Lianzhou (廉州镇), Dangjiang (党江镇), Xichang (西场镇), Shagang (沙岗镇), Wujia (乌家镇), Zhakou (闸口镇), Gongguan (公馆镇), Baisha (白沙镇), Shankou (山口镇), Shatian (沙田镇), Shiwan (石湾镇), Shikang (石康镇), Changle (常乐镇)

Townships:
Quzhang Township (曲樟乡), Xingdaohu Township (星岛湖乡)

Transportation 
China National Highway 209

Famous people
 Lao Yi

Climate

References

External links 
 Official site (in Simplified Chinese)

 
Counties of Guangxi
Beihai